Serena Bibiana Amato (born September 10, 1974 in Olivos) is a sailor from Argentina, who won a bronze medal at the 2000 Summer Olympics in Sydney.

References

External links
 

1974 births
Living people
Argentine female sailors (sport)
Olympic sailors of Argentina
Olympic bronze medalists for Argentina
Olympic medalists in sailing
Sailors at the 1996 Summer Olympics – Europe
Sailors at the 2000 Summer Olympics – Europe
Sailors at the 2004 Summer Olympics – Europe
Pan American Games gold medalists for Argentina
Sailors at the 1999 Pan American Games
People from Vicente López Partido
Medalists at the 2000 Summer Olympics
Pan American Games medalists in sailing
Medalists at the 1999 Pan American Games
Sportspeople from Buenos Aires Province
20th-century Argentine women
21st-century Argentine women